"Have Some Madeira M'Dear", also titled "Madeira, M'Dear?", is a darkly comic song by Flanders and Swann.

The lyrics tell of an elderly rake who "slyly inveigles" an attractive girl of 17 to his flat to view his collection of (unperforated) stamps, where he offers her a glass of Madeira, a fortified Portuguese wine. The girl enthusiastically drains her glass, becoming slightly drunk in the process. Sensing victory, he offers her another glass, which she accepts. However, before raising it to her lips, she recalls her dying mother's warning to avoid red wine. With a cry, the girl drops the glass and flees the apartment, the old roué's pleas for her to remain echoing in her ears. The following morning, however, she wakes in bed with a hangover and a beard tickling her ear.

The song contains three much-quoted instances of zeugma:

 And he said as he hastened to put out the cat, the wine, his cigar and the lamps
 She lowered her standards by raising her glass, her courage, her eyes and his hopes
 She made no reply, up her mind and a dash for the door.

The song has been covered by other groups, including most notably the Limeliters (performed by Lou Gottlieb). The lyrics were also recited as a poem by Tony Randall in episode #922 of The Carol Burnett Show which first aired February 21, 1976.

Notes and references
Notes

References

Sources
 

Flanders and Swann songs
Black comedy music
1956 songs
Songs about alcohol